The International Science Festival in Gothenburg (Swedish: Vetenskapsfestivalen) is an annual festival in Gothenburg with science activities.

About the festival 
The International Science Festival in Gothenburg took place for the first time in April 1997 and is since then an annual recurrent event.
The purpose is to communicate science to the public and schools in an easy accessible and in a thought provoking manner. Another objective is to create a positive attitude to research and science which is intended to encourage higher education.

About  come each year. This makes it the largest popular science event in Sweden and one of the largest popular science events in Europe.

University of Gothenburg and Chalmers University of Technology contributes with the knowledge.

The International Science Festival in Gothenburg is a member of the European Science Events Association, EUSCEA.

Theme 
Each year a special theme that the festival focuses on is chosen: (translated)
2001: Food and eatables
2002: Travel and science expeditions, Life and Medicine
2003: Love and energy
2004: The meaning of life and sustainable development
2005: Design, physics, Finland
2006: Athletics & health
2007: Passion, pistil and personality
2008: Let's play
2009: Civilization in all times and countries
2010: Sustainable feature with small and large changes
2011: Creativity
2012: It's all in the brain
2013: Control or No Clue
2014: Act : React : Interact
2015: Life and Death
2016: Same but Different, 13-17 April

See also 
 Universeum - Public science centre in Gothenburg, Sweden
 Hackerspace - Space for people into technology

References

External links 
 Official homepage (2012)
 Search for activities (parametric search)
 Program for 2012, pdf 5 MB (English at page 46)
 Where the paper version can be picked up in 2012, pdf 2 MB (Swedish)

1997 establishments in Sweden
Festivals in Sweden
Science education
Science in society
Tourist attractions in Gothenburg